is a Japanese classical music composer. He is well known for composing the 2003 remake of Astro Boy.

Biography
Yoshimatsu was born and raised in Yoyogi, Tokyo. He did not receive formal musical training while growing up. Yoshimatsu was a fan of The Walker Brothers and The Ventures when he was 13, but symphonies of Ludwig van Beethoven and Pyotr Ilyich Tchaikovsky fascinated him when he was 14. When he entered Keio High School, he had hoped to go to medical school, but eventually changed his aspirations to become a symphony writer. While studying at the Faculty of Engineering at Keio University, he became an apprentice of Teizo Matsumura. Although he says that he was not influenced in any way by Matsumura's style, his 1974 solo piano piece, To the companion star of Sirius (Op. 1), shows a strong influence of contemporary music, including Matsumura's. He was introduced to Manabu Kawai, a professor at Tokyo University of the Arts, who encouraged him to study harmony and counterpoint, but he gave up taking lessons after a few months and left the university in March 1974. At this time, while composing music as art music, he was also fascinated by progressive rock music such as Pink Floyd, Yes, Emerson, Lake & Palmer, etc., and joined rock bands as a keyboard player.

In 1975, through Matsumura's introduction, Yoshimatsu met Isao Harada, and on November 28, 1978, he made his debut as a composer by presenting Forgetful Angel at a private concert hosted by Harada (although he received no fee for the composition). In the meantime, he entered various composition competitions about 20 times and was unsuccessful, but in 1980, Dorian for orchestra was selected for the Composition Prize of the Foundation for the Promotion of Symphony Music. Since then he composed a number of pieces before making his name with the serialist Threnody to Toki in 1981. In Hiroshi Aoshima's book Composer's Way of Thinking (Kodansha's New Library of Knowledge, 2004), there is a description that he won the Otaka prize for Threnody to Toki (p. 263), but Yoshimatsu himself has denied this on his website.

Soon afterwards, Yoshimatsu became disenchanted with atonal music, and began to compose in a free neo-romantic style with strong influences from jazz, rock and Japanese classical music, underscoring his reputation with his 1985 guitar concerto. , Yoshimatsu has presented six symphonies, 12 concertos: one each for bassoon, cello, guitar, trombone, alto saxophone, soprano saxophone, marimba, chamber orchestra, traditional Japanese instruments, and two for piano (one for the left hand only and one for both hands), a number of sonatas, and various shorter pieces for ensembles of various sizes. His 'Atom Hearts Club Suites' for string orchestra explicitly pay homage to the Beatles, Pink Floyd and Emerson, Lake & Palmer.

The majority of his work is triadic and contains simple, repeated progressions, or in some cases pandiatonicism. Often extended tertian harmonies are followed by whole tone harmonies (such as in the first movement of Symphony No. 5; or the first movement of his "Cyber Bird" Concerto for alto saxophone, which, in addition, makes use of free atonal jazz; or the final movement of his "Orion Machine" Concerto; or in his Saxophone Concerto "Albireo Mode"). His works for Japanese traditional instruments (such as Subaru, and Within Dreams, Without Dreams) make use of traditional Japanese scales and tunings.

He has published some essays and primers about classical music.

Notable compositions 
''Pleiades Dances

References

External links
 
 

1953 births
20th-century classical composers
20th-century Japanese composers
20th-century Japanese male musicians
21st-century classical composers
21st-century Japanese composers
21st-century Japanese male musicians
Japanese classical composers
Japanese male classical composers
Keio University alumni
Living people
Musicians from Tokyo